The 41st Edition Vuelta a España (Tour of Spain), a long-distance bicycle stage race and one of the three grand tours, was held from 22 April to 13 May 1986.

Teams and riders

Route

General classification (final)

References

 
1986 in road cycling
1986
1986 in Spanish sport
1986 Super Prestige Pernod International